Si Woo Park (born 26 June 1991) is a South Korean mixed martial artist, currently competing in the atomweight division of Jewels.

As of January 3, 2022, Fight Matrix ranks her as the eight best atomweight in the world, while Sherdog ranks her as the seventh best atomweight in the world.

Mixed martial arts career

Early career
Park made her professional debut against Jeong Eun Park at Road FC 042 x Chungju World Martial Arts Festival on September 23, 2017. Park won the fight by unanimous decision.

Park was scheduled to face Sayako Fujita at GRACHAN 35 on May 27, 2018. Fujita won the fight by unanimous decision.

Park returned to Japan for her next fight, as she was scheduled to fight Emi Tomimatsu at DEEP 85 Impact on August 26, 2018. She notched her first professional victory, prevailing over Tomimatsu by unanimous decision.

Park faced Jae Choi at KAISER 02 in her fourth professional fight. Park extended her winning streak to two fights, winning once again by decision.

Deep Jewels
Park was scheduled to fight Hikaru Aono at DEEP 93 Impact on December 15, 2019. She won the fight by a first-round technical knockout.

Park was next scheduled to face Saori Oshima at Deep Jewels 31 on December 19, 2020. Park won the closely contested bout by unanimous decision.

Park participated in the Deep Jewels atomweight Grand Prix, which was held to crown a new champion, as the title was left vacant after Tomo Maesawa retired. Park was scheduled to face Mizuki Oshiro in the tournament quarterfinals at Deep Jewels 32 on March 7, 2021. Park won the fight by unanimous decision, extending her winning streak to five fights. Advancing to the tournament semifinals, Park fought a rematch with Saori Oshima at Deep Jewels 33 on June 19, 2021. Although she managed to knock Oshima down midway through the first round, Oshima was able to snatch an armbar from the bottom, winning by way of submission.

Park was scheduled to face the undefeated Seika Izawa at DEEP 104 Impact on October 23, 2021. Park lost the fight by unanimous decision, with scores of 28-27, 29-26, 29-26. Fight Matrix ranked her as a top ten atomweight between January 3, 2021 and July 4, 2021, peaking at #5 in April 2021. She exited the rankings following her loss to Izawa.

Rizin FF
Park faced the 2017 Rizin Women's Super Atomweight (49 kg) tournament runner-Up Rena Kubota at Rizin 33 - Saitama on December 31, 2021. Park won the fight by unanimous decision.

Park was expected to face Aira Koga at Deep Jewels 36 on March 12, 2022. The fight was later postponed for Deep Jewels 37 on April 9, 2022. Park won the fight by unanimous decision, with all three judges scoring the bout 30–27 in her favor.

2022 Super Atomweight Grand Prix
Park faced the 2017 Rizin Women's Super Atomweight Grand Prix Winner Kanna Asakura at Rizin 37 - Saitama on July 31, 2022, in the quarterfinal bout of the Rizin Super Atomweight Grand Prix. Aside from the tournament title, a prize of ¥7,000,000 was on the line for the eventual winner as well. Park won the fight by a dominant unanimous decision.

Park faced the former two-time Rizin Super Atomweight Championship titleholder Ayaka Hamasaki in the tournament semifinals, which were held at Rizin 38 on September 25, 2022. She won the fight by unanimous decision.

Park rematched Seika Izawa in the final of the Rizin Super Atomweight Grand Prix on December 31, 2022 at Rizin 40. She lost the close bout via split decision.

Kickboxing career
As an amateur kickboxer, Park captured gold medals at the 2012 WAKO Asian Championships and the 2013 Asian Indoor and Martial Arts Games, both times as an atomweight in the full contact category. Park made her professional kickboxing debut against Panchan Rina at REBELS 61 on June 9, 2019. Rina won the fight by unanimous decision.

Fight record

Mixed martial arts record

 
|-
|Loss
|align=center| 9–5
|Seika Izawa
|Decision (split)
|Rizin 40
|
|align=center| 3
|align=center| 5:00
|Saitama, Japan
|
|-
|Win
|align=center|9–4
|Ayaka Hamasaki
|Decision (unanimous)
|Rizin 38
|
|align=center|3
|align=center|5:00
|Saitama, Japan
|
|-
|Win
|align=center| 8–4
|Kanna Asakura
|Decision (unanimous)
|Rizin 37
|
|align=center| 3
|align=center| 5:00
|Saitama, Japan
|
|-
| Win
| align=center| 7–4
|Aira Koga
|Decision (unanimous)
|DEEP Cage Impact In Osaka 2022
|
| align=center| 3
| align=center| 5:00
|Osaka, Japan
|
|-
| Win
| align=center| 6–4
|Rena Kubota
|Decision (unanimous)
|Rizin 33
|
| align=center| 3
| align=center| 5:00
|Saitama, Japan
|
|-
| Loss
| align=center| 5–4
| Seika Izawa
| Decision (unanimous)
| DEEP 104 Impact
| 
| align=center| 3
| align=center| 5:00
| Tokyo, Japan
| 
|-
| Loss
| align=center| 5–3
| Saori Oshima
| Technical Submission (armbar)
| Deep Jewels 33
| 
| align=center| 1
| align=center| 2:28
| Minato, Tokyo, Japan
|
|-
| Win
| align=center| 5–2
| Mizuki Oshiro
| Decision (unanimous)
| Deep Jewels 32
| 
| align=center| 2
| align=center| 5:00
| Bunkyo, Tokyo, Japan
| 
|-
| Win
| align=center| 4–2
| Saori Oshima
| Decision (unanimous)
| Deep Jewels 31
| 
| align=center| 3
| align=center| 5:00
| Shinjuku, Tokyo, Japan
|
|-
| Win
| align=center| 3–2
| Hikaru Aono
| TKO (punches)
| DEEP 93 Impact
| 
| align=center| 3
| align=center| 5:00
| Tokyo, Japan
|
|-
| Win
| align=center| 2–2
| Jae Choi
| Decision (unanimous)
| KAISER 02
| 
| align=center| 2
| align=center| 5:00
| Andong, South Korea
|
|-
| Win
| align=center| 1–2
| Emi Tomimatsu
| Decision (unanimous)
| DEEP 85 Impact
| 
| align=center| 3
| align=center| 5:00
| Tokyo, Japan
|
|-
| Loss
| align=center| 0–2
| Sayako Fujita
| Decision (unanimous)
| Grachan 35 / 1MC Vol. 6
| 
| align=center| 2
| align=center| 5:00
| Tokyo, Japan
|
|-
| Loss
| align=center| 0–1
| Jeong Eun Park
| Decision (unanimous)
| Road FC 042 x Chungju World Martial Arts Festival
| 
| align=center| 2
| align=center| 5:00
| Chungju, South Korea
|
|-

Kickboxing record

|-  style="background:#fbb;"
| 2019-06-09|| Loss ||align=left| Panchan Rina || REBELS 61 || Fukuoka, Japan || Decision (Unanimous) || 3 || 2:00
|-
| colspan=9 | Legend:

See also
 List of female mixed martial artists

References

1991 births
South Korean female mixed martial artists
Living people
People from Busan
Sportspeople from Busan
Atomweight mixed martial artists
Mixed martial artists utilizing taekwondo
South Korean female kickboxers
South Korean female taekwondo practitioners